Catherine Sheffield, Duchess of Buckingham and Normanby (c. 1681 – 13 March 1743), formerly Lady Catherine Darnley, was an illegitimate daughter of King James II of England, and was married to two English noblemen in succession.

Lady Catherine was the king's daughter by his mistress Catherine Sedley, Countess of Dorchester, and was given the surname Darnley with reference to her father's ancestor, Lord Darnley. There was some doubt about her paternity, as Catherine Sedley was thought to have other lovers. By royal warrant, Lady Catherine Darnley was given the status of a duke's daughter in the order of precedence. Her arms granted by James II are incorporated today in those of the Marquess of Normanby, indicating that King James accepted her as his natural child.  

Lady Catherine's first husband was James Annesley, 3rd Earl of Anglesey, whom she married on 28 October 1699 at Westminster Abbey. The couple were separated in 1701 by Act of Parliament, on the grounds of the earl's cruelty, with the countess claiming that he had tried to murder her. She left him while he was defending himself from her claim in the House of Lords. The earl contracted tuberculosis and died early in 1702. 

They had one daughter, Lady Catherine Annesley (c. 1700-1736), who married, first, William Phipps, and second, John Sheldon (or Skelton). 

On 16 March 1706, the widowed countess married, as his third wife, John Sheffield, 1st Duke of Buckingham and Normanby; the wedding took place at St Martin-in-the-Fields. The duke, a great supporter of King James, was more than thirty years older than his new duchess, and they had three children, two of whom died in infancy:
John Sheffield, Marquess of Normanby (1710)
Robert Sheffield, Marquess of Normanby (1711-1715)
Edmund Sheffield, 2nd Duke of Buckingham and Normanby (1716-1735), who died unmarried.

The duke's previous marriages were said to have been unhappy, but he doted on Catherine, with their friend Alexander Pope claiming that "whenever they have had any difference... he could never stay till suppertime... nor till she returned back of herself into his room, but constantly left his books or business to come after her, and said, "Child, you and I should never fall out; and though I still think myself in the right, yet you shall have it in your way." When the duke died in 1721, she called on Pope and Francis Atterbury to produce a memorial edition of his poems and other works.

As all of Catherine's children pre-deceased her, the dukedom became extinct and her late husband's titles and estates passed to his illegitimate son, Sir Charles Herbert Sheffield, 1st Baronet. The descendants of her daughter, Lady Catherine Annesley, included Constantine Phipps, 1st Baron Mulgrave, Henry Phipps, 1st Earl of Mulgrave, the Hon. Charles Phipps, MP and General the Hon. Edmund Phipps.

References

1680s births
1743 deaths
Buckingham and Normanby
Anglesey
Daughters of British earls
Burials at Westminster Abbey
Illegitimate children of James II of England
Daughters of kings